The 1976 Astro-Bluebonnet Bowl was the 18th edition of the college football bowl game, played at the Astrodome in Houston, Texas, on December 31. Part of the 1976–77 bowl game season, It matched the thirteenth-ranked Nebraska Cornhuskers of the Big Eight Conference and the #9 Texas Tech Red Raiders of the Southwest Conference (SWC). Down by ten points in the second half, Nebraska rallied to win 27–24.

Teams

Both teams were making their only appearances in the Astro-Bluebonnet Bowl; this edition (ninth as "Astro-") was played on New Year's Eve at 7 p.m. CST. The Sugar Bowl had been played in this time slot the previous four years, but moved back to New Year's Day this season.

Nebraska

The Cornhusers started the season ranked first, but a tie to LSU dropped them to #8. Five straight victories made them rise back to third before a matchup with  The  home loss dropped them to ninth, with victories over Kansas and #13 Oklahoma State doing nothing to make them rise nor fall. Losses to Iowa State and  dropped them to thirteenth, with a lopsided win at Hawaii ending the regular season on a high note. The Huskers tied for fourth in the Big Eight Conference (with Iowa State) at 4–3 in a year where Oklahoma, Oklahoma State, and Colorado all won a share of the conference title at 5–2. This was Nebraska's sixth bowl game of the decade along with their seventh straight bowl appearance.

Texas Tech

However, a loss to #9 Houston at home cost them a chance at an undefeated season, though wins at Arkansas and  meant that the Red Raiders won a share of the SWC, their first conference title since 1955. This was Texas Tech's fifth bowl appearance of the decade. Nebraska 27 Texas tech 24

Scoring
First quarter
Nebraska – Rick Berns 1-yard run (Al Eveland kick), 5:42 remaining
Texas Tech – Brian Hall 28-yard field goal, 1:22
Second quarter
Texas Tech – Billy Taylor 14-yard pass from Rodney Allison (Hall kick), 12:08
Texas Tech – Taylor 11-yard pass from Allison (Hall kick), 2:14
Nebraska – Mark Dufresne 22-yard pass from Vince Ferragamo (Eveland kick), 0:33
Third quarter
Texas Tech – Taylor 8-yard run (Hall kick), 11:32
Nebraska – Berns 18-yard run (kick failed), 9:19
Nebraska – Chuck Malito 23-yard pass from Ferragamo (Eveland kick), 7:01
Fourth quarter
No scoring

Reg Gast recovered a Red Raider fumble with 1:34 left in the game to seal the game for Nebraska, who rallied twice from ten-point

Statistics
{| class=wikitable style="text-align:center"
! Statistics !! Nebraska!! Texas Tech 
|-
|align=left|First downs || 21|| 24
|-
|align=left|Rushes–yards|| 49–164||  42–191
|-
|align=left|Passing yards|| 232|| 193
|-
|align=left|Passes (C–A–I)|| 14–24–0|| 15–23–0
|-
|-
|align=left|Total offense || 73–396|| 65–384
|-
|align=left|Punts–average ||3–36|| 4–40
|-
|align=left|Fumbles–lost ||2–2|| 4–1
|-
|align=left|Turnovers by|| 2|| 1
|-
| Penalties–yards || 1–4 || 2–21
|}

Aftermath
The teams switched places in the final AP poll, Nebraska climbed to ninth and Texas Tech fell to thirteenth.

The bowl win was Nebraska's seventh in the last eight seasons, and the Huskers had regular bowl appearances for the rest of Osborne's tenure.  only reached three bowl games combined in rest of the decade and the next one. Neither returned to the Astro-Bluebonnet Bowl after this game.

References

Astro-Bluebonnet Bowl
Bluebonnet Bowl
Nebraska Cornhuskers football bowl games
Texas Tech Red Raiders football bowl games
1976 in sports in Texas
December 1976 sports events in the United States